The Golden Gate (1986) is the first novel by poet and novelist Vikram Seth. The work is a novel in verse composed of 590 Onegin stanzas (sonnets written in iambic tetrameter, with the rhyme scheme following the AbAbCCddEffEgg pattern of Eugene Onegin). It was inspired by Charles Johnston's translation of Pushkin's Eugene Onegin.

Plot summary
Set in the 1980s, The Golden Gate follows a group of yuppies in San Francisco. The inciting action occurs when protagonist John Brown has his former love Janet Hayakawa place an amorous advertisement of himself in the newspaper; the latter answered, at length, by trial-lawyer Elisabeth ('Liz') Dorati. A short heyday follows, in which Seth introduces and develops a variety of characters united in part by their interest in self-actualization (often in the form of agriculture) and in part by closeness to Liz or John. Thereafter is depicted the progress of their marriage de facto until its dissolution, which results in the legal marriage of Liz to John's friend Phillip ('Phil') Weiss, and the birth of their son. Following his rejection of Liz, John finds a second paramour in Janet, until the latter and two other friends die in an automobile collision; and is himself invited to stand godfather to Liz's son.

The novel brought its author the 1988 Sahitya Akademi Award for English, by the Sahitya Akademi, India's National Academy of Letters.

Background
At the time of the novel's composition, Seth was a graduate student in Economics at Stanford University.  Seth described the origins of the novel as a "pure fluke."  While conducting tedious research for his dissertation, Seth would divert himself with trips to the Stanford Bookstore: On one such occasion, I found in the poetry section, two translations of Eugene Onegin, Alexander Pushkin's great novel in verse. Two translations but each of them maintained the same stanzaic form that Pushkin had used. Not because I was interested in Pushkin or Eugene Onegin, but purely because I thought, this is interesting technically that both of them should have been translated so faithfully, at least as far as the form goes. I began to compare the two translations, to get access to the original stanzas behind them, as I don’t know Russian. After a while, that exercise failed, because I found myself reading one of them for pure pleasure. I must have read it five times that month. It was addictive. And suddenly, I realized that this was the form I was looking for to tell my tales of California. The little short stories I had in my mind subsided and this more organically oriented novel came into being. I loved the form, the ability that Pushkin had to run through a wide range of emotions, from absolute flippancy to real sorrow and passages that would make you think, during and after reading it."

In addition, portions of the novel make reference to (the now defunct) Printers Inc. Bookstore and Cafe in neighboring  Palo Alto, California (sonnets 8.13 to 8.16).

Themes
At intervals, various characters discuss arguments either against or in favor of homosexuality, Christianity, civil disobedience, feminism, and tolerance; whereas the narrative, by example of danger or anti-intellectualism, implies warning against alcoholism or carelessness, and elsewhere criticizes news-media and art-criticism for unjust treatment of their subjects.

References

External links
Powell's review
The Literary Encyclopedia (in progress)
An online copy of Charles Johnston's translation of Onegin
Information on the opera

Verse novels
1986 British novels
Sonnet studies
Novels by Vikram Seth
Indian English-language novels
British LGBT novels
Sahitya Akademi Award-winning works
Random House books
Novels set in San Francisco
20th-century Indian novels
1986 novels
1986 debut novels